Mount Korsch is a pyramidal peak, rising to about  on the northwest margin of Markham Plateau, Queen Elizabeth Range, Antarctica,  west of Mount Markham. It was named by the Advisory Committee on Antarctic Names in 1988 after geologist Russell J. Korsch who, with E. Stump and D. Egerton, climbed and geologically mapped this peak on December 3, 1985, as a member of a United States Antarctic Research Program (USARP) field party. Korsch was a member of USARP field parties, 1968–69 and 1985–86, and of New Zealand Antarctic Research Program field parties, 1982–83 and 1984–85.

References

Mountains of the Ross Dependency
Shackleton Coast